Matiašovce (Goral: Mačasovce) is a village and municipality in Kežmarok District in the Prešov Region of north Slovakia.

History
In historical records the village was first mentioned in 1326.

Geography
The municipality lies at an altitude of 556 metres and covers an area of 17.506 km² . It has a population of about 790 people.

References

External links
https://web.archive.org/web/20160804115019/http://matiasovce.e-obce.sk/

Villages and municipalities in Kežmarok District